Osniel Cecilio Rendón González (born ) is a Cuban volleyball player. He was part of the Cuba men's national volleyball team from 2014-2017. On club level he plays for Montes Claros/América Volei.

References

External links
 profile at FIVB.org
 Player profile at Volleybox.net

1996 births
Living people
Cuban men's volleyball players
Place of birth missing (living people)
Olympic volleyball players of Cuba
Volleyball players at the 2016 Summer Olympics
21st-century Cuban people